"Here Comes the Sun" is a song by The Beatles.

Here Comes the Sun may also refer to:

 Here Comes the Sun (Holt novel), a science-fiction novel by  Tom Holt
 Here Comes the Sun (Dennis-Benn novel), a novel by Nicole Dennis-Benn
 Here Comes the Sun (film), a 1946 British film
 Here Comes the Sun (Nina Simone album), 1971
 Here Comes the Sun (Rachael Leahcar album)
 "Here Comes the Sun" (Sweetbox song)
 Here Comes The Sun (yacht)
 "Here Comes The Sun", a 2021 song by Bill Wurtz
 "Look, Here Comes the Sun", a 1968 charting single by The Sunshine Company